Frondibacter mangrovi is a Gram-negative, chemoheterotrophic, strictly aerobic, rod-shaped and non-motile bacterium from the genus of Frondibacter which has been isolated from a mangrove estuary in Japan.

References 

Flavobacteria
Bacteria described in 2017